Gigatitan is an extinct genus of titanopteran insect that lived in Kyrgyzstan during the Triassic period. The type species is G. vulgaris, described by Aleksandr Grigorevich Sharov in 1968. Fossils of Gigatitan have been found in the Madygen Formation. It is the type genus of the family Gigatitanidae, in which the closely related Nanotitan and Ootitan are also included.

Description 

Although it had large wings, which hindwing area is close to modern large orthopteran Pseudophyllanax imperialis, body volume is estimated to be around 150% heavier than that species, suggesting Gigatitan was not able to fly, but probably able to glide. In life, Gigatitan was a mantis-like predator, with forelegs that have similarly enlarged and bore spines for prey capture. It had dark, transverse stripes on its wings, which is similar to modern diurnal mantis Blepharopsis mendica. Also, its wings were able to produce flashes which works only during day, and possibly it can substantially reduce predation from predators. These characters suggesting that Gigatian is diurnal predator. As seen in other titanopteran insects, there are prominent fluted regions on the forewings, suggesting that may used for stridulation, but unlike modern crickets or katydids, both males and females of Gigatitan had wings for stridulation. The ovipositor of Gigatitan bore sharp cutting ridges. These were likely used to excise holes in plant matter for oviposition, similar to some modern Orthoptera.

References 

Insects described in 1968
Triassic insects
Triassic animals of Asia
Carnian genera
Fossils of Kyrgyzstan
Madygen Formation
Fossil taxa described in 1968
Orthopterida